Michael Deshown Ford (born May 27, 1990) is an American football running back who is currently a free agent. Ford was signed by the Chicago Bears after going undrafted in the 2013 NFL Draft, and played college football at LSU. Ford was considered one of the better running back prospects of his class.

High school career
A native of Leesville, Louisiana, Ford was an All-American running back at Leesville High School. Regarded as a four-star recruit by Rivals.com, Ford was listed as the #7 running back prospect in the class of 2009.

College career
In 2012, Ford ranked second in the Southeastern Conference in kickoff returns, averaging 27.5 yards on 20 returns, along with four kickoff returns of 40 yards or more; one of those returns was for 86 yards against Arkansas, which set up a touchdown. Ford concluded his college career with 37 appearances, and 5 games started, scoring 14 touchdowns (13 rushing and 1 receiving).

Professional career

2013 NFL Draft
Ford put up impressive combine results measuring in at 5-9.5 210 pounds, running an unofficial 4.38 40 yard dash and bench pressing 225 pounds 25 times. He was ranked number one at his prospective position in the broad jump with a distance of 10 feet 10 inches, third in the vertical jump with a height of 39.5 inches, fourth in the 60 yard shuttle with a time of 11.43 seconds, and fifth in the 3-cone drill with a time of 6.87 seconds (Combine results from nfl.com). His bench press is listed as 7th best, however, 3 of the prospects he is ranked behind more than likely will be fullback candidates in the NFL not a true running back.

Chicago Bears
After going undrafted in the 2013 NFL Draft, Ford was signed by the Chicago Bears on April 28. The Bears released Ford on August 23, 2014.

Hamilton Tiger-Cats
Ford signed with the Hamilton Tiger-Cats on June 10, 2015.

Atlanta Falcons
On August 7, 2015, Ford was signed by the Atlanta Falcons. On August 30, 2015, he was waived by the Falcons.

Second stint with the Tiger-Cats
On September 27, 2015, Ford was added to the Tiger-Cats' non-active roster. He was added to the active roster on October 1, 2015.

References

External links
Chicago Bears bio
LSU Tigers bio
Hamilton Tiger-Cats bio

1990 births
Living people
People from Leesville, Louisiana
Players of American football from Louisiana
American football running backs
African-American players of American football
LSU Tigers football players
Chicago Bears players
Hamilton Tiger-Cats players
Atlanta Falcons players
21st-century African-American sportspeople